Tovomita chachapoyasensis is a species of flowering plant in the family Clusiaceae. It is found only in Peru.

References

chachapoyasensis
Endemic flora of Peru
Vulnerable flora of South America
Taxonomy articles created by Polbot